Tupikov is a Russian masculine surname, its feminine counterpart is Tupikova. Notable people with the surname include:

Konstantin Tupikov (born 1983), Ukrainian figure skater 

Russian-language surnames